The 4th Imola Grand Prix was a motor race, run to Formula One rules, held on 21 April 1963 at the Autodromo di Castellaccis. The previous three Imola Grands Prix were sports car races held in the mid-1950s, and this was the first Formula One event held at the circuit. From 1981, the circuit was the venue for the San Marino Grand Prix.

The race was run over 50 laps of the circuit, and was won by British driver Jim Clark in a Lotus 25, lapping the entire field except for second-placed Jo Siffert. Trevor Taylor set the fastest lap after losing more than ten laps with a gear selector problem.

Results

References

 "The Grand Prix Who's Who", Steve Small, 1995.
 "The Formula One Record Book", John Thompson, 1974.
 Race results at www.silhouet.com 

Imola Grand Prix